XDE may refer to:

 XDE, IATA code for Diébougou Airport in Burkina Faso
 Xerox Development Environment (XDE), one of the first integrated development environments
 IBM Rational Rose XDE, an "eXtended Development Environment" (XDE) for software developers
 MainWin XDE, software that allowed Microsoft to produce Internet Explorer for UNIX